Jeremy McWilliams (born 4 April 1964 in Belfast) is a motorcycle road racer from Northern Ireland. McWilliams became ineligible for mainstream racing after the 2014 season due to his age exceeding the 50-year-old cutoff point, but has continued to ride occasionally in fringe events not controlled by the FIM.<ref name="MCN 2014">Jeremy McWilliams to race in Moto2 – aged 50!! "Moto2 age limit regulations state: 'For the Moto2 riders, the limit for the maximum age finishes at the end of the year in which the rider reaches the age of 50.". Motorcycle News, 21 August/24 November 2014. Retrieved 16 September 2022</ref>

Career

 Early career (1993-2001) 
Between 1993 and 2001, McWilliams rode in the 250cc and 500cc classes. He took two podiums in the 500cc class in 2000, at the Italian GP and the British GP. The following year he won the 250cc race in the Netherlands aboard an Aprilia.

 MotoGP and British Superbikes (2002-2007) 
In 2002 and 2003, McWilliams rode for Kenny Roberts' Team KR in MotoGP aboard the Proton KR bike. In a surprising performance, he took pole position at the 2002 Australian GP, riding a three-cylinder two-stroke bike against the much more competitive four strokes. His best race result over these two years was 6th at the 2003 French GP.

In 2004, he rode the much-maligned Aprilia RS Cube in MotoGP, alongside Shane Byrne. His best finish was 12th place, which he achieved three times, amidst a season where he was frequently hurt due to the vicious nature of the bike. He later claimed to have experienced broken ribs and a dislocated collarbone, amongst other injuries, during that season.

For 2005, McWilliams was contracted to return to the Kenny Roberts KR team, who would be receiving engine support from KTM. However, Dorna stepped in later and revoked the contract on the insistence that Shane Byrne be given the ride. This came as a huge disappointment to McWilliams, leaving him scrambling to find a ride late into the off-season.

Instead, he spent 2005 racing in the British Superbike Championship on a Honda, but finished outside the top 10 in the end of year standings, partly due to a shoulder injury suffered during the season.

Later in the year, he did get a chance to fulfill his initial plans of riding the for Team Roberts in MotoGP. KTM withdrew their support for the team one day before the Czech grand prix at Brno, refusing to supply engines. This left the team in a difficult situation, as they were contractually obliged to fill their position on the grid, but had no engines to use. Furthermore, the team's sole rider, Shane Byrne, was technically contracted to KTM and unable to ride any other bike, leaving Byrne unable to compete and Team Roberts with no rider.

With less than 24 hours notice, McWilliams found himself competing at Brno in the Czech Republic, racing on the Team Roberts Proton V5 bike the team used in 2004. The weekend started promisingly, as McWilliams immediately started posting lap times as much as 1.5 seconds quicker than what the bike had posted the previous year. However, McWilliams ended up being forced to retire from the race due to an engine sensor failure, causing the throttle to stick open.

Following the race, McWilliams expressed interest in competing in the rest of the season. Team Roberts subsequently announced that they would not be able to make it to the flyaway races due to their sudden loss of funds from the now terminated KTM deal, but hoped to show at the season-ending race in Valencia with McWilliams. For reasons unknown, the team and McWilliams failed to show.

For 2007, McWilliams was contracted to race in the MotoGP series for the newly-founded Ilmor team, despite a heavy crash in testing in late 2006. He had to miss the first race of the season in Qatar, due to another crash, near the end of the Losail International Circuit. After this round the team suspended its racing operations and did not return.

 Later years (2012-present) 
In 2012, McWilliams participated in the North West 200 races, where he scored a second place in the Super-Twin event. Riding for the KMR Racing Team, McWilliams finished second behind his fellow Irishman, Ryan Farquhar.

In 2013, McWilliams had a supporting role in the film Under the Skin, starring Scarlett Johansson.

In 2014, McWilliams returned to Grand Prix racing at the age of 50 for a one-off wildcard ride in the Moto2 series at the British Grand Prix held at Silverstone. He finished in 29th place aboard a machine with American origins entered as Brough Superior, using the controlled-standard 600 cc four-cylinder Honda engine.2014 Silverstone Moto2 Results & Recap ultimatemotorcycling.com, 1 September 2014. Retrieved 16 September 2022

McWilliams occasionally enters fringe events not controlled by the FIM with their age limit.Jeremy McWilliams To Replace Injured Dan Kneen In Mar-Train Yamaha Team northwest200.org, 8 May 2016. Retrieved 16 September 2022

McWilliams is involved in development work for motorcycle and tyre manufacturers, such as KTM, and also in coaching young riders through his Masterclass race schools.

Career statistics

Grand Prix motorcycle racing

By season

By class

Races by year
(key) (Races in bold indicate pole position)

Superbike World Championship

Races by year
(key) (Races in bold''' indicate pole position) (Races in italics'' indicate fastest lap)

References

External links

 

1964 births
Living people
Sportspeople from Belfast
250cc World Championship riders
500cc World Championship riders
MotoGP World Championship riders
British motorcycle racers
Motorcycle racers from Northern Ireland
British Superbike Championship riders
Moto2 World Championship riders